Cathie Beck (born August 3, 1955) is an American journalist and creative writer based in Denver, Colorado. Her memoir Cheap Cabernet: A Friendship, which she self-published in October 2009, was published by Hyperion Books in July 2010.

Her short stories have been published in Riverrun Literary Magazine, Glimmer Train Literary Collective, Red Dirt Publications, and Zoetrope Stories, to name a few, and in innumerable university literary periodicals and publications.

Graduate of the Louisiana Tech University Journalism Department, and the Creative Writing Graduate Program at the University of Colorado at Boulder, Beck has written for the Daily Camera (Boulder), the Los Angeles Times, The Denver Post, The Rocky Mountain News, The Denver Business Journal, Poets & Writers Magazine, and Writer's Digest. She presently contributes to a number of major publications, including The Denver Post, and is “The Wine Wench” columnist for ColoradoBiz magazine and KUVO in Denver, Colorado.

She is the recipient of the Louisiana Press Women's and Denver Press Woman's Writing Awards, the Scripps-Howard Award for Excellence in Journalism, and the University of Colorado’s Dean's Award for Writing.

Biography 
Born in Ft. Dodge, Iowa, Beck has called Indianapolis, Indiana, New Orleans, Louisiana, and Boulder, Colorado home. She currently resides in Denver, Colorado.

Literary Influences 
Beck's literary influences include Flannery O'Connor, Dorothy Parker, Anton Chekhov, Leo Tolstoy, Raymond Carver, Barbara Kingsolver, Frank McCourt, and David Sedaris.

References

The Denver Post people
1955 births
Living people